Pseudagrion lindicum is a species of damselfly in the family Coenagrionidae. It is found in Kenya, Mozambique, Somalia, Tanzania, and possibly Uganda. Its natural habitats are subtropical or tropical moist lowland forests, subtropical or tropical dry shrubland, subtropical or tropical moist shrubland, rivers, intermittent rivers, freshwater marshes, and intermittent freshwater marshes.

References

Coenagrionidae
Insects described in 1902
Taxonomy articles created by Polbot